George Cannon McMurtry (14 November 1867 – 29 September 1918) was a New Zealand scientist, smelting engineer, mining manager and consultant, orchardist. He was born in Camberwell, Surrey, England on 14 November 1867.

References

1867 births
1918 deaths
New Zealand chemical engineers
Mining engineers
New Zealand orchardists
New Zealand metallurgists
People from Camberwell
English emigrants to New Zealand